The 1893 Tennessee Volunteers football team represented the University of Tennessee as an independent the 1893 college football season. The 1893 season was Tennessee's third season as a varsity squad. The 1893 varsity team was to be the last until 1896 because the university "wanted to put emphasis on academics."  The Vols went 2–5, losing the first five games.

Schedule

References

Tennessee
Tennessee Volunteers football seasons
Tennessee Volunteers football